English-language idioms